Dervish Cara was an Albanian revolutionary leader known for his role in the Albanian Revolt of 1844, a revolt also known by his name as "the Uprising of Dervish Cara".

Biography

Background
Dervish Cara was born in Palçishte, Kalkandelen (present-day Tetovo). He was a quiet villager and hails from the Carë clan from the Šar Mountains.

Tanzimat reforms
Tanzimât emerged from the minds of reformist sultans Mahmud II and his son, sultan Abdülmecid I. It aimed to modernize the Ottoman Empire by introducing European-inspired reforms. Most importantly, it involved a centralization and streamlining of the administration and military. This hurt the old-established feudal order among the Empire's Muslim communities, and especially the various local leaders who had exercised considerable regional authority and often enjoyed wide-ranging autonomy from the imperial government.

The Tanzimat reforms caused the uprising as the new reforms began the arresting and liquidation of the local Albanophone pashas, most notably that of Abdurrahman Pasha of Kalkandelen and his two brothers, Havzi Pasha of Uskub (present-day Skopje), who later died in prison, and Hussein Pasha of Kustendil (present-day Kyustendil).

The revolt

Dervish Cara began his revolt when he and his rebel army seized Gostivar from Ottoman control in November and began directing his forces towards Kalkandelen (modern day Tetovo). The fight for full occupation of Kalkandelen lasted three weeks, at the end of December to the beginning of January, 1844.

Kalkandelen became the center of the uprising, turning the Arabati Baba Teḱe into the headquarters of the insurgents and using the Baltepes fortress to defend the town. After being reinforced in Gostivar and Tetovo, Cara sent messengers to the pashas of Debre, Prizren, Priştine and Vranje, but at the same time preparing for attack against Uskub, where he knew that there were supporters of his movement. In February 1844, the rebels attacked and seized Uskub.

A Great Council was formed and led by Dervish Cara, which was the supreme body of the newly created administration in the liberated territories. In February 1844 the rebels liberated Kumanovo. After Kumonovo the rebels liberated Preshevo, Bujanovc, Vranje, Leskofça and other territories in North Kosovo. The rebellion was spread out in İpek, Yakova, Prizren and İşkodra, while in the spring of 1844 the territory of the rebellion was from Ohri and Manastır in the south, İşkodra in west, North Kosovo in North and Kumanovo in east. The rebels sent a letter to the Albanians of Sanjak of Yanina recalling them brothers and asking them not to fight for the Ottoman army.

During a brief pause in the fighting, the Sublime Porte tried to end the rebellion through negotiations. Dervish Cara requested that Albanians be exempt from the law of the Ottoman army, under which all Muslims were forced to serve in the regular army (Nizam); stop the replacement of Ottoman local government officials (who were Albanians or spoke Albanian) with Turkish officials brought from Anatolia, who knew neither the language and customs; and the recognition of Albanian autonomy within the Ottoman Empire, as was recognized the autonomy of Serbia in 1830. The Sublime Porte did not accept the terms and countered with their own. They offered that amnesty would be given to the rebels as well as abolishment of the new taxes and the postponement of the recruitment process which would become voluntary in the future. However, the rebels must hand over their armaments to the Ottoman commander in chief Omer Pasha and no Albanian autonomy with in the empire. Cara refused the offer and fighting resumed.

During negotiations Omer Pasha, Governor of Lebanon, led an army of 30000 men towards Monastir. The first resistance to Omer Pasha's forces was in Kicevo, though resistance did not last as Ottoman forces pushed back the rebels into their strongholds in Uskub, Kumanovo and Kalkandelen. After Gostivar fell, Omer Pasha directed all forces to Kalandelen to crush the rebellion. As to not underestimate Dervish Cara and his feats, Omar Pasha armed his forces with heavy artillery and shelled the stronghold. The battle lasted from May to September 1844, resulting in the capture of Kalkandelen and Dervish Cara.

The aftermath
Dervish Cara was sentenced to death by the Ottoman Porte, but the sentence was later reduced to a lifetime sentence. He died in the Ottoman prisons.

Legacy
Dervish Cara inspired the rebels in Debar and İşkodra to continue. A school is named after him in Palcište and the work of paving the road “Dervish Cara” has started in Tetovo. In a bid to rename many streets in Macedonia's capital, Skopje, Dervish Cara name has been suggested by the Albanian political parties.

References

Conflicts in 1844
19th-century Albanian people
Prisoners who died in Ottoman detention
Albanian prisoners sentenced to death
Year of death missing
Year of birth missing
People from Tetovo Municipality
Albanian people who died in prison custody
19th-century Albanian military personnel
Albanians in North Macedonia
Activists of the Albanian National Awakening